Patenga is a sea beach of the Bay of Bengal, located  south from the port city of Chattogram, Bangladesh. It is near to the mouth of the Karnaphuli River. The beach is very close to the Bangladesh Naval Academy of the Bangladesh Navy and Shah Amanat International Airport.

See also
 List of lighthouses in Bangladesh
 Shah Amanat International Airport

References

External links

Bay of Bengal
Beaches of Bangladesh
Lighthouses in Bangladesh
Tourist attractions in Chittagong Division